Events from the year 1315 in Ireland.

Incumbent
Lord: Edward II

Events

26 May – opening of Bruce campaign in Ireland by Edward Bruce. His army sacks Granard – he is proclaimed by Irish allies as King of Ireland.
Dundalk was sacked by Edward De Bruce
The first significant leader of the Butler clan, Edmond le Bottiler, became Earl of Carrig (Carrick-on-Suir)

Births

Deaths

References

 
1310s in Ireland
Ireland
Years of the 14th century in Ireland